John McGee may refer to:

 John McGee (greyhound trainer), seven times UK champion trainer
 John McGee (politician) (born 1973), American state legislator in the Idaho Senate
 John B. McGee, American state legislator in the Nevada Assembly between 1874 and 1876
 John Edward McGee, Jr., professionally known as John Edward (born 1969), American self-proclaimed psychic
 John F. McGee (1861–1925), U.S. federal judge
 John Joseph McGee (1845–1927), Clerk of the Privy Council of Canada

See also
 Jack McGee (disambiguation)
 John Magee (disambiguation)